The Capt. William Sims House is a historic mansion in Greenfield, Tennessee, U.S.

History
The two-story mansion was completed in 1861. It was designed in the Greek Revival architectural style. An additional ell was completed in 1880. It was built for William Sims, who served as a captain in the Confederate States Army during the American Civil War. In the 1980s, the house still belonged to his descendants.

Architectural significance
It has been listed on the National Register of Historic Places since March 25, 1982.

References

Houses on the National Register of Historic Places in Tennessee
Greek Revival houses in Tennessee
Houses completed in 1861
Houses in Weakley County, Tennessee
National Register of Historic Places in Weakley County, Tennessee